Valea Comenzii River may refer to:

 Valea Comenzii, another name for the upper course of the Râul Mic in Sibiu County, Romania
 Valea Comenzii, a headwater of the Sădurel in Sibiu County, Romania